Chip Rawlins (born 1949) is an American writer and the co-author of The Complete Walker IV with Colin Fletcher. He also publishes under the name C. L. Rawlins .  Rawlins is a non-fiction writer, poet, outdoor guide, and instructor. Previous jobs include: firefighter, science editor, and field hydrologist.

Biography
Rawlins was born in 1949, in Laramie, Wyoming. He went to Utah State University and was a Wallace Stegner Fellow at Stanford University. He lives in Laramie, where he has served as president of the Wyoming Outdoor Council and on the Greater Yellowstone Coalition. He has also lived in New Zealand .

Books
 A Ceremony on Bare Ground (1985)
 Sky's Witness:  A year in the Wind River Range (Henry Holt, 1993)
 Broken Country: Mountains and Memory (Henry Holt, 1996)
 In Gravity National Park (University of Nevada, 1998)
 The Complete Walker IV (Alfred A. Knopf, 2002)

Awards
 USFS National Primitive Skills Award
1999 Poetry Prize from the Mountain and Plains Booksellers Association
 Stegner Fellowship

References

External links
 Wyoming Authors Wiki Entry

Living people
American travel writers
American male non-fiction writers
American nature writers
Writers from Wyoming
Utah State University alumni
Stanford University alumni
People from Laramie, Wyoming
Place of birth missing (living people)
Stegner Fellows
1949 births